The first season of My Hero Academia anime television series was produced by Bones and directed by Kenji Nagasaki, with Yōsuke Kuroda handling series composition, Yoshihiko Umakoshi providing character designs and Yuki Hayashi composed the music. The season adapts Kōhei Horikoshi's original manga series of the same name from the beginning of the 1st volume to shortly after the 3rd volume over 13 episodes. Covering the first story arcs (chapters 1–21), My Hero Academia is set in a world where currently most of the human population has gained the ability to develop superpowers called  with around 80% of the world population that has a Quirk. The story follows the adventures of Izuku Midoriya, a boy who dreams of becoming a superhero himself despite being Quirkless. He is scouted by Japan's greatest hero All Might, who passes his Quirk to him and helps to enroll him in U.A. High, the prestigious high school for heroes in training.

The season initially ran from April 3 to June 26, 2016, on MBS in Japan, and was released on DVD and Blu-ray in five compilations, each containing two to three episodes, by Toho between June 29 and October 12, 2016. Funimation licensed the series for an English dubbed release in North America and released the episodes in a single DVD and Blu-Ray compilation on April 18, 2017. FunimationNow, Crunchyroll and Hulu are streaming the series outside of Asia. Animax Asia is simulcasting the series in the same day it airs. Eventually, their adaptation ran from May 5 to August 4, 2018, on Adult Swim as part of its Toonami programming block.

Two pieces of theme music are used for this season: an opening theme and an ending theme. The opening theme is "The Day", performed by Porno Graffitti and the ending theme is "Heroes", performed by Brian the Sun.


Episode list

Home video release

Japanese
Toho released the series on DVD and Blu-ray in five volumes in Japan, with the first volume being released on June 29, 2016, and the last volume being released on October 12, 2016.

English
The series was released in North America by Funimation, who released a limited edition combo set, a standard combo set, and a DVD set on April 18, 2017. Funimation also released the series in Australia and New Zealand through Universal Sony Pictures Home Entertainment, where it received a limited edition combo release. Universal Sony later released standard editions of the DVD and Blu-ray in Australia and New Zealand on August 15, 2018. Funimation later released the series in Australia and New Zealand via Madman Entertainment, with the combo release scheduled for December 4, 2019. In the UK and Ireland, Funimation distributed the limited edition combo release through Universal Pictures UK on May 15, 2019, and the standard edition DVD and Blu-ray through Manga Entertainment on June 10, 2019.

Reception
This is the ratings for the first season of My Hero Academia, which aired on Toonami in the US.

Notes

References

My Hero Academia episode lists
2016 Japanese television seasons